is a Japanese singer. She was a former member and leader of Prizmmy, a Japanese dance and vocal unit under Avex Pictures. She is a first and third generation member of Roni Girls, a Japanese children's clothing brand. She appeared on The Karaoke Battle U-18, and was the runner-up on LDH's The Girls Audition.

Early life 
Born in Saitama Prefecture, she is the eldest of the two children in her family. She began to dance at age 3 and participated in many dance performances before she debuted.

Reina passed her college entrance exams on November 8, 2017. Reina attended Komazawa University.

Career 
She became a member of ChibikkoAAA on March 25, 2009 a mini version of the group AAA (band). She portrayed Misako Uno, one of two female members.

She participated in Kirachalle on July 25, 2009, in the modelling department.

Reina was also a first and third generation Roni Girl. Her former Prizmmy members Mia Kusakabe, Karin Takahashi, and Hina Miyazaki were also brand models and dancers. They had dance performances while they modeled for the clothing they performed in. She was a first generation Dance Style Kid.

In 2011, Reina was 1 of 3 girls featured for anime Pretty Rhythm where she portrayed a trainee who learned fashion, dancing and singing with the aim to debut. In 2012 she hosted the second and third seasons of the series Pretty Rhythm: Dear My Future and Pretty Rhythm: Rainbow Live appearing at the end of the anime with Prizmmy and their sister group Prism Mates.

2012–2017: Prizmmy 
Reina debuted as the leader of Prizmmy on March 16, 2012, with the song "Everybody's Gonna be Happy" which was also the fourth ending of the anime Pretty Rhythm: Aurora Dream. When the second season of Pretty Rhythm aired, she was given an anime version like the other members and was named Reina Miyama, who was one of the season's main characters.

She released 12 singles, 1 mini album and 3 albums with Prizmmy.

On December 9, 2016, along with Prizmmy members and Prism Mates, they announced that the group would disband in March 2017. They finally disbanded on March 31, 2017, following their sold-out performance on March 30. Their last album "Prizmmy☆ THE BEST!!" was released on February 22, 2017.

2017–present: solo activities 
Reina left Avex and became a freelance artist, performing as a backup dancer for various releases by Meik. She participated in Kanjani's The Mozart No.1 Music King Final Participation.

In December 2017 Reina appeared on Tonight, the birth! Music Champion Finalists! . Later that month she appeared alongside former Prism Mates member Runa Suzuki in Gene High National Youth Dance Cup .

In early 2018, Reina appeared with Runa again on After School Swag performing the song "I Love You" by Chris Hart.

In July 2018, Reina appeared on The Karaoke Battle  winning second place.

She also performed in Miyoshimatsuri in early September.

In early September Reina participated in LDH's The Girls Audition in the vocal and dance department. She got into the last judging round but ended up as the runner-up.

On December 4, EXPG Lab announced that Reina had joined EXPG Lab Vocal. She also revealed via EXPG LAB's Official Instagram that she would join EXPG'S REX THE LIVE on December.

From 2018 to 2019, Reina was a backup dancer at EXILE LIVE TOUR 2018–2019 “STAR OF WISH”.

In July 2021, It was revealed that Reina would be participating in Mnet's survival show Girls Planet 999 as a contestant. It started airing on August 6, 2021 She was eliminated in episode eight and finished tenth in J-Group.

Filmography

TV appearances

Music video appearances

Discography

Notes

References

External links 
 Reina Ameba Blog
EXPG LAB Official Profile

1999 births
Living people
People from Saitama Prefecture
J-pop singers
Japanese dancers
Girls Planet 999 contestants